The Tomb of Boghrat is built by the Qajar dynasty and This building is located in Sabzevar.

Sources 

Mausoleums in Iran
National works of Iran
Tourist attractions in Razavi Khorasan Province